Lesley Brooker is an Australian ornithologist based in Western Australia following retirement from a career with the CSIRO's Division of Wildlife Research.  There she worked, as a database manager and computer modeller, on developing methodologies for the re-design and restoration of agricultural lands for bird conservation. Since then she has collaborated with her husband Michael Brooker in studies on cuckoo evolution, population ecology of fairy-wrens and spatial dynamics of birds in fragmented landscapes.  In 2004 she was awarded, jointly with her husband Michael, the Royal Australasian Ornithologists Union's D.L. Serventy Medal which recognizes excellence in published work on birds in the Australasian region.

Booker was also a trip leader for the Western Australian Branch of Birdlife Australia and contributed to the Birds in the Great Western Woodlands, a joint project between BirdLife Australia and The Nature Conservancy (https://www.birdlife.org.au/documents/GWW-Final-Report.pdf)

Selected works

References

Olsen, Penny. (2005). D.L. Serventy Medal 2005: Citation. Lesley and Michael Brooker. Emu 105: 341.

External links 

 

Living people
Australian ornithologists
CSIRO people
Women ornithologists
Year of birth missing (living people)